Schistura altipedunculatus is a species of ray-finned fish in the genus Schistura.

References 

A
Fish described in 1968
Taxa named by Petre Mihai Bănărescu
Taxa named by Teodor T. Nalbant